Bradley Jacob Taylor (born 14 March 1997) is an English cricketer. Taylor is a right-handed batsman who bowls right-arm off break. He was born at Winchester, Hampshire. Educated at Eggar's School, Alton Hampshire where he played on the school team.

Taylor made his debut for Hampshire in a List A match against Bangladesh A at the Rose Bowl in 2013. In a match which Hampshire won by 9 runs, Taylor ended Hampshire's innings of 223 not out with 2 runs, while with the ball he took the wickets of Naeem Islam and Sohag Gazi, finishing with figures of 2/23.

In December 2015 he was named as the captain of England's squad for the 2016 Under-19 Cricket World Cup.

References

External list
 

1997 births
Living people
Cricketers from Winchester
English cricketers
Hampshire cricketers